Contradiction: Spot the Liar!, also known as Contradiction: The All-Video Murder Mystery Adventure or just Contradiction is an FMV game developed by video game music composer Tim Follin through Kickstarter crowdfunding with production company Baggy Cat and released through Apple Inc.'s iOS App Store and Mac App Store on January 14, 2015 and Steam on July 10, 2015. The game follows the investigation of Detective Inspector Frederick Jenks into the apparent suicide of Kate Vine in the small village of Edenton. It is the final live action performance of actor Paul Darrow.

Gameplay
The player controls a character called Detective Jenks and the main gameplay element of the game are the interviews or interrogations with various characters in the village of Edenton. The player has a list of subjects which the detective can ask the interviewees about and the other characters’ answers are recorded and summarised as small snippets of information. If the player spots that any of the characters have given seemingly contradictory information, the player must choose the two contradictory snippets, after which the detective confronts the lying character about the contradiction.

The player is also free to move about the village to search for additional clues which can be used as subjects when talking with the other characters. At some points, the player must use objects which Detective Jenks has found or been given at certain points in the village in order to advance the story, such as using a key found on the ground in order to unlock a lock. Sometimes when entering a certain area, an event will happen, such as unexpectedly encountering another person.

The game relies heavily on recorded video: All the questions asked by Detective Jenks and all the answers given by anyone he asks are live-action recordings. All the various scenes and events are also recordings.

The typical gameplay consists of talking to a person by choosing the subjects available to you and possibly unlocking new subjects for use with other characters. The player then moves on to another character or investigates the surroundings in order to find more subjects and clues and then interrogates the characters about the new-found subjects. The game progresses as characters slip up and tell a lie and are confronted with their lies. The story is then advanced when they are forced to give additional information to explain their contradiction, be it another lie or the truth.

Follin recommends the game be played with one person at the keyboard and a group of friends in the room, aiding the player.

Story
Detective Inspector Frederick Jenks has been sent to the small village of Edenton to investigate the death of a young woman named Kate Vine. While Kate's initial cause of death, drowning, paints her death to be a suicide, there are several pieces of evidence that suggest there's more to Kate's end than meets the eye. Namely, Kate was found to have morphine in her system, and her driver's license was found taped to the ground in the woods. Kate had also been attending a controversial business course known as ATLAS prior to her death.

Jenks investigates the area's local residents: Emma Bowman, a friend of Kate; Emma's boyfriend Simon who knew Kate through ATLAS; conspiracy theorist James; ATLAS owner Paul Rand; Paul's son Ryan Rand; and Ryan's wife Rebecca. During his investigation into the area and interviews with the residents, Jenks pieces together details of the late Kate as he closes in on her killer, but he soon finds himself investigating a much larger plot as the secrets of the town are exposed.

Development
Follin had been planning the game “on and off for a number of years” but started working on the game mechanic in late 2012. The game was conceived as a demo in order to demonstrate whether the concept had legs to stand on. Even when the project began to take its shape, a lack of funding meant that elements of the story and gameplay had to be excised; Follin explained "it's a cut down version of a longer story that I had in mind". Follin also scored and produced the game's soundtrack.

The game had a Kickstarter campaign running from January 4, 2014, to January 18, 2014, with a target of £3,000. Most of the money would be spent on actors, crew, equipment hire and location fees and the goal was to film all scenes on location. The Kickstarter gained £4,010. A stretch goal was added in order to receive additional funds to hire professional actors; Follin acknowledged that the success of an FMV game would largely be based on the quality of acting.

The game was shot on location in the village of Great Budworth in Cheshire, and St Helens and Mawdesley in Lancashire, United Kingdom. The dialogue scenes took 11 days to shoot, and additional scenes were filmed throughout 2014. The cast includes Rupert Booth, Paul Darrow, John Guilor, and Magnus Sinding.

The game was released on January 14, 2015, for iPad on Apple AppStore and on July 10, 2015, for Windows PC and Mac OS X on Steam.

Critical reception
Polygon gave the game a positive review, saying: "Developers like Follin have taken something that, let's be honest, never worked that well to begin with, out to the woodshed, dismantled it and reassembled its core components into something that really makes sense." 148Apps implied that the game marked a step forward in adventure games at large, stating that "murder mystery point and click adventures won't be the same".

PC Gamer found some issues with menus and navigation, while praising the "overly cheesy" acting and the contradiction gaming mechanic, the latter of which they found rewarding. RockPaperShotgun found it frustrating that some seemingly-legitimate contradictions weren't acknowledged by the game's logic. AdventureGamers appreciated the slickness of the production and the in-depthness of the story, though found the conclusion underwhelming and a bit of a bait-and-switch. Hardcore Gamer felt that despite the game's flaws, it was "enthralling" and enjoyably campy.

Possible sequel
While Follin would love to make a sequel, he has not-so-fond memories of the incredibly strenuous effort he put into making the first game. For a sequel to ever come to pass, he would need to amass a suitable budget and pay professionals to do all the tasks he had to learn himself. A potential evolution of the series would be by approaching Amazon TV, thereby turning it from a video game into an interactive TV show. Due to a lack of funding, Follin was forced to invest thousands of pounds of his own money to finish his vision of the game; even then he had to cut many of his story threads. For this reason, according to him, a sequel depends on "whether I make my investment back on this one first." Once the player finishes the game, there is a plea by the developers to contribute to the crowdfunding effort to make the sequel a reality.

Due to the ATLAS element of the game not having a satisfactory conclusion in Contradiction, Follin would like the sequel to draw to a close this story, before spending the rest of the game embarking on a brand new adventure with Inspector Jenks. A larger budget would see added physical interaction to the gameplay, a different location such as a coastal setting, and a night and day structure which would take place over a week rather than Contradiction's seven hours.

References

External links

Developer website
At Metacritic
An interview from 2013
Tim Talks to Contradiction: Spot The Liar!
Interview at TalkingComicBooks
Interview at TheSnargePodcast
Interview with Kasterborous

2015 video games
Adventure games
Detective video games
Full motion video based games
Interactive movie video games
IOS games
Kickstarter-funded video games
MacOS games
Mystery video games
Video games about police officers
Video games developed in the United Kingdom
Video games scored by Tim Follin
Windows games